Ku Yong-jo (July 17, 1955 – March 2001) was a boxer from North Korea, who won the gold medal in the bantamweight (–54 kg) division at the 1976 Summer Olympics in Montreal, Quebec, Canada. In the final, he defeated American boxer Charles Mooney. In 1980, he competed in the featherweight division and, after receiving a first-round bye, lost his first bout to Krzysztof Kosedowski of Poland.

Olympic results 

Montreal 1976

1st round bye
 Round of 32: Defeated Faredin Ibrahim (Romania) on points, 4–1
 Round of 16: Defeated Chacho Andreykovski (Bulgaria) on points, 5–0
 Quarterfinal: Defeated Weerachart Saturngrun (Thailand) on points, 5–0
 Semifinal: Defeated Pat Cowdell (Great Britain) on points, 4–1
 Final: Defeated Charles Mooney (United States) on points, 5–0 (won gold medal)

Moscow 1980

 Round of 32: bye
 Round of 16 Lost to Krzysztof Kosedowski (Poland) on points, 0–5

References

External links
 
 

1955 births
2001 deaths
Featherweight boxers
Bantamweight boxers
Boxers at the 1980 Summer Olympics
Boxers at the 1976 Summer Olympics
Olympic gold medalists for North Korea
Olympic boxers of North Korea
Olympic medalists in boxing
Medalists at the 1976 Summer Olympics
Asian Games gold medalists for North Korea
Asian Games medalists in boxing
Boxers at the 1974 Asian Games
Boxers at the 1978 Asian Games
Medalists at the 1974 Asian Games
Medalists at the 1978 Asian Games
People from Hamhung
North Korean male boxers
People's Athletes
20th-century North Korean people